Villianur taluk is one of four taluks in the Pondicherry District of the union territory of Puducherry. It comprises villages under Villianur and Mannadipet Commune. Villianur taluk is further divided into four sub-taluks or firkas, namely Kodathur, Mannadipet, Thondamanatham and Villianur.

References

External links 
 North East Monsoon 2009 - Action Plan
 Right to Information Act Manual published by Department of Revenue and Disaster Management, Government of Puducherry

Taluks of Puducherry
Puducherry district